Kavalande is a village in Nanjangud taluk, Mysore district of Karnataka state, India.

Location
Kavalande is between Nanjangud town and Chamarajanagar town. The village center is called Dodda-Kavalande and it lies on the south of the railway station immediately after the level crossing. The small village of Chikka-Kavalande lies on the north of the railway station at a distance of 1.56 km. A third village called K.R.Pura lies on the eastern side of Dodda-Kavalande on the highway to Chamarajanagar.

Post office
There is a post office in the village and the postal code is 571312.

Transportation
There is a railway station in Kavalande. The village comes under the Mysore–Chamarajanagar branch line.

Economy
The village is agrarian in its economic activity. There is a branch of Indian Overseas Bank.

Temples

 Chikkakowlande Temple
 K.R.Puram Math
 K.R.Puram Temple
 K.R.Puram Stone Temple
 Devanuru Dasoha Mutt

Image gallery

See also
Kadakola
Nanjangud Town
Chinnada Gudi Hundi
Badanavalu 
Narasam Budhi
Badana Guppe
Mariyala-Gangavadi Halt
Mukkadahalli

References

Villages in Mysore district